Fonville may refer to:

Fonville, North Carolina
Fonville (surname)